An incomplete list of films produced in Japan ordered by year in the 1930s.  For an alphabetical list of films see :Category:Japanese films.  Also see cinema of Japan.

References

Footnotes

Sources

External links
 Japanese film at the Internet Movie Database

1930s
Japanese
Films